The Better Together programme, started in April 2009, is an initiative of the Scottish National Health Service to improve the patient experience focus in order to improve NHS services.

The programme is designed to support NHS boards, frontline staff and patients in driving forward service improvement.
 
That  patient experience programme currently has 2 streams:

•An analytical stream that sits within the Scottish Government.

•An implementation stream that sits within Healthcare Improvement Scotland.

References

2011 establishments in Scotland
NHS Scotland